The Whangarei Harbour Marine Reserve is a protected area in the North Island of New Zealand. It was established in 2006 and measures  over two sites.  The students and faculty of the nearby Kamo High School played an important role in establishing this reserve.

The reserve is governed by the Marine Reserves Act 1971 and is administered by the Department of Conservation. It was announced at an event held at Kamo High School in 2006 by the then Minister of Conservation, the Hon Chris Carter.

See also
Marine reserves of New Zealand

References

External links
Whangarei Harbour Marine Reserve at the Department of Conservation
Maps of the reserve

Marine reserves of New Zealand
Whangārei
Whangarei District
Protected areas established in 2006
2006 establishments in New Zealand
Protected areas of the Northland Region